Phish (also known as The White Tape) is a demo album released by the American rock band Phish on cassette in 1986. Often cited as the first Phish "album", The White Tape was originally a collection of original material that the band used as a demo/sample tape for venues, and was sometimes labelled "Phish" or simply "Demo". The album was widely circulated among Phish fans for more than a decade before being officially released in 1998.

The album was created from four-track recordings over a period of three years and includes a number of outside musicians performing on various songs. Only "Alumni Blues", "AC/DC Bag", "Slave To The Traffic Light" and "Dog Gone Dog" (a.k.a. "Dog Log") have the four band members together. The remaining tracks were recorded separately by various members and blended together to create the finished album.

The White Tape includes an early version of the Phish epic "You Enjoy Myself", performed a cappella with the band members singing the opening guitar lines. The album also contains avant-garde experimental pieces, instrumental passages, electronic noises and studio trickery. Some songs were further developed and figure heavily in the band's live performances, while a few have rarely been heard since.

All instruments and vocals on "Fuck Your Face", "NO2", "He Ent to the Bog" and "Minkin" are performed solely by bass guitarist Mike Gordon. All instruments and vocals on "Run Like an Antelope" and "And So to Bed" are recorded solely by Trey Anastasio.

"The Divided Sky", "Ingest" and "Fluff's Travels" are performed by Anastasio, Phish lyricist Tom Marshall, and their friend Marc Daubert on percussion. "Aftermath" has Anastasio and Roger Holloway on guitar. "Slave to the Traffic Light" has Tom Marshall on keyboards and Pete Cottone on drums.

In addition to being released on CD, this album was made available on June 7, 2006, as a download in FLAC and MP3 formats at LivePhish.com.

A limited edition white vinyl version was released at Superball IX, Phish's 2011 summer festival with the remainder offered up for sale as part of Record Store Day's "Black Friday" promotion on November 25, 2011. The song "And So to Bed" was finally debuted live in 2021, 25 years after "The White Tape" was originally released

Track listing

Personnel

Phish – perform as a quartet only on "Alumni Blues", "AC/DC Bag" and "Dog Gone Dog"
 Trey Anastasio – all instruments and vocals on "And So To Bed", "You Enjoy Myself", "Fluff's Travels" and "Letter to Jimmy Page", vocals and guitar on "Alumni Blues", "AC/DC Bag", "Divided Sky", "Slave to the Traffic Light", "Aftermath", "Dog Gone Dog" and "Run Like an Antelope", percussion on "Divided Sky", keyboards on "Slave to the Traffic Light" and "Ingest", bass guitar on "Slave to the Traffic Light", artwork and Phish logo design
 Mike Gordon – bass guitar and vocals on "Alumni Blues", "AC/DC Bag", "Fuck Your Face", "Dog Gone Dog", "He Ent to the Bog" and "Minkin", guitar on "Fuck Your Face", "He Ent to the Bog" and "Minkin", vocals and sound effects on "NO2", bongos on "Minkin"
 Page McConnell – keyboards and organ on "Alumni Blues", "AC/DC Bag" and "Dog Gone Dog"
 Jon Fishman – drums on "Alumni Blues", "AC/DC Bag" and "Dog Gone Dog"

Additional musicians
 Dave Abrahams – backing vocals on "Slave to the Traffic Light"
 Ernie Anastasio – laugh on "Ingest"
 Becca Buxbaum – backing vocals on "He Ent to the Bog" and "Minkin", flute on "Minkin"
 Lillian Cherry – backing vocals on "Minkin"
 Pete Cottone – drums on "Slave to the Traffic Light"
 Richard D'Amato – backing vocals on "Minkin"
 Marc Daubert – backing vocals on "Slave to the Traffic Light"
 David Gordon – backing vocals on "He Ent to the Bog"
 Roger Holloway – guitar on "Aftermath"
 Tom Marshall – backing vocals on "Slave to the Traffic Light" and "Run Like An Antelope"
 Marge Minkin – additional vocals on "Minkin"
 Dan McBride – backing vocals on "He Ent to the Bog"

References

External links
 Phish.com – Official Site
 Phish.com: The White Tape
 Phish.net: The White Tape – Includes details on cassette versions.
 Vinyl White Tape – Record Store Day

1986 debut albums
Phish albums
LivePhish.com Downloads